The United Nations General Assembly designated the years 2011–2020 as the third International Decade for the Eradication of Colonialism, recalling that 2010 marked the fiftieth anniversary of the declaration on the granting of independence to colonial countries and peoples.

Previous similar decades were proclaimed for 1990–2000 and 2001–2010 as the Second International Decade for the Eradication of Colonialism.

After these three 2021-2030 has been declared as Fourth International Decade for the Eradication of Colonialism by General Assembly of UN.

See also
Special Committee on Decolonization
Decolonization

References

United Nations General Assembly
Decolonization